Fargesia albocerea is a species of bamboo in the family Poaceae, native to western Yunnan province in China. As its synonym Borinda albocerea it has gained the Royal Horticultural Society's Award of Garden Merit as an ornamental.

References

albocerea
Endemic flora of Yunnan
Plants described in 1988